Nicolas Ysambert (1565 or 1569—May 14, 1642) was a French, Roman Catholic theologian, and lifelong teacher at the Sorbonne.

Life
Born at Orléans, Ysambert studied theology at the Sorbonne and was made a fellow (socius) of the college in 1598. Thenceforth he professed theology with such success as to attract public attention.

In 1616 King Louis XIII founded at the Sorbonne a new chair of theology for the study of the controversial questions between Catholics and Protestants. The professor in charge had to give on every working day an hour's lecture followed by a half-hour of familiar conference with his auditors. Ysambert was appointed to this chair by the king, who in this instance had reserved to himself the nomination. This appointment, which was an honour in itself, was still more enhanced by the eulogies bestowed on Ysambert in the letters patent which designated him, wherein the king praises his competence and station, and his experiences in theology, controversial matters, and other sciences. From the time of his appointment as is evident from the manuscripts of his course, one of which is preserved at the library of Toulouse, which was begun in 1618, Ysambert took as the basis of his letters the Summa Theologica of Thomas Aquinas upon which he seems to have commentated until the end of his career of teaching. His lessons won him a wide reputation, which he retained until his death.

In the councils of the theological faculty he was chiefly distinguished for his share in the censure directed against Marc Antonio de Dominis, the apostate Archbishop of Spalatro, and author of De republica christiana, against ecclesiastical hierarchy; he was the first to point out the heretical doctrine to the faculty and he brought about its condemnation. When Edmond Richer laboured to revive in the theological faculty a somewhat modified Gallicanism, Ysambert with the theologian Duval became the zealous defender of the rights of the Holy See. To learning Ysambert joined great strictness of life, solidity of judgment, and a precision and sense of justice much appreciated in the decision of cases of conscience.

He died at Paris.

Works
He began publishing his Disputationes, or commentaries on the Summa Theologica of  Thomas Aquinas, but it was not completed during his life (Paris, 1638–48).

Attribution

1560s births
17th-century French Catholic theologians
1642 deaths
Writers from Orléans
University of Paris alumni